Stari Gradac   is a village in Croatia. It is connected by the D2 highway.

Populated places in Virovitica-Podravina County